The International Library & Cultural Centre (ILCC) was established in Ranchi when the British Council division had closed its establishment in the year 1995. The ILCC is being managed by a trust at the British Council premises at Ranchi and is hosting about 36000 book stocks.

References

Ranchi
Libraries in India